Marion Ashmore (born Roger Marion Ashmore) was a player in the National Football League. He played his first two seasons with the Milwaukee Badgers and the Duluth Eskimos before playing his final two with the Green Bay Packers.

References

Players of American football from Illinois
Milwaukee Badgers players
Duluth Eskimos players
Green Bay Packers players
Gonzaga Bulldogs football players
1899 births
1948 deaths